Love & Stuff is an 2020 American documentary film written, directed, and produced by Judith Helfand. It follows Helfand as she deals with her mothers belongings following her death, and becoming a mother.

It had its world premiere at Hot Docs Canadian International Film Festival on May 28, 2020.

Synopsis
The film follows Judith Helfand, as she goes through her mothers belongings following her death, and becoming a mother for the very first time.

Production
The film is a continuation of a 2014 New York Times Op-ed documentary, picking up where it leaves off. The project was initially conceived and edited as a documentary series, however, it struggled to get funding as platforms only agreed to commit to it once it was further along. It was then re-edited into a feature-length film.

Release
The film had its world premiere at the Hot Docs Canadian International Film Festival on May 28, 2020. It also screened at DOC NYC on November 11, 2020.

Reception

References

External links
 
 
 

2020 films
2020 documentary films
American documentary films
Documentary films about women
2020s English-language films
2020s American films